John Raphael Rogers (c. 1857 - February 18, 1934) invented the Typograph, a form of typesetting machine.  The patent for setting a line of type in a single bar of metal was held by the Linotype company, so Rogers was unable to market his invention in the US. He sold the patent to a German company, and it was used successfully in Germany for some years.

He was born in Roseville, Illinois, to John A. Rogers and Elizabeth Embree Rogers.  He graduated from Oberlin College with a bachelor's degree in 1875.  He worked as a school teacher and school superintendent until 1886, after which he worked on his inventions full time.  He received a patent for the Rogers Typograph in 1888.

References 

1934 deaths
People from Brooklyn
American inventors
1850s births